Sambughetto is a frazione (and parish) of the municipality of Valstrona, in Piedmont, northern Italy.

Overview

It is a village located some km from the main road of the Valle Strona, on the left side of Strona river. Near the village are located several interesting natural caves where remains of ursus spelaeus have been found.

Since 1928 it was a separate comune (municipality).

References

External links

Frazioni of Valstrona
Former municipalities of the Province of Verbano-Cusio-Ossola